Addison & Corrie was an architectural partnership of George Henry Male Addison and Leslie Corrie, based in Brisbane, Queensland, Australia.

Together they designed many prominent Queensland buildings, including:
 addition of schoolroom and guest wing, Franklyn Vale Homestead, a heritage-listed homestead at Grandchester, 1900
 Trustees Chambers, a heritage-listed commercial building at 43 Queen Street, Brisbane built in about 1900

See also
 :Category:Addison & Corrie buildings

References

Architects from Brisbane
Addison & Corrie buildings